The Globe Investment Trust plc was a very large British investment trust. It was listed on the London Stock Exchange and was a constituent of the FTSE 100 Index. The trust's portfolio included a mix of large, medium, and small-cap stocks across a range of sectors and regions. It was suitable for investors who are looking for international diversification and a long-term investment horizon.

History
The Company was founded in 1873 as an investment trust dedicated to international equities. It was managed by Charterhouse Group.

In July 1990 the British Coal Pension Fund launched a hostile and ultimately successful takeover bid paying £1.1bn for what was at the time the United Kingdom's largest investment trust.

References

Financial services companies based in London
Financial services companies established in 1873
Companies formerly listed on the London Stock Exchange